Erbil District is a district of the Erbil Governorate in Iraq. It contains three sub-districts, Ankawa, Behirke and Shamamek, and 379 villages. The District of Erbil is centered on the city of Erbil.

References

Districts of Erbil Governorate
Erbil Governorate